The Science Fiction Fantasy Short Film Festival (SFFSFF) is an international genre film festival devoted to fantasy and science fiction cinema from across the globe. The SFFSFF takes place annually every winter in Seattle, Washington at the world-renowned Seattle Cinerama Theater. The festival brings together industry professionals in filmmaking and the genres of science fiction and fantasy to encourage and support new, creative additions to science fiction and fantasy cinema arts. The (SFFSFF) is a co-production of the EMP Museum and SIFF.

Overview
Originally, the festival when it was announced in 2005 was named the Science Fiction Short Film Festival. The word and subject field of Fantasy was added later for the 2009 edition. SFFSFF's mission is to promote and encourage awareness, appreciation and understanding of the art of science fiction & fantasy cinema.  "Seattle’s robust art scene and strong film culture offers opportunities for creative filmmakers to tell stories within the framework of science fiction, and fosters a connection between filmmakers, directors, producers, writers and audiences," said Therese Littleton, EMP/SFM spokesperson. "This is a great event to recognize achievement and innovation in science fiction filmmaking and storytelling disciplines and EMP/SFM is very proud to be a part of it." Submissions will be judged based on originality, quality, artistic merit, innovation, voice, style and narrative. A nationally recognized panel of distinguished film, television, literature, and science fiction industry professionals, peers and film critics has reviewed qualifying submissions each year of the festival to select the winners.

Past festivals

2006
The first Science Fiction Short Film Festival was held February 4, 2006 at the Seattle Cinerama Theater in Seattle, Washington.
Twenty original short films were showcased in competition to win a development pitch with the SCI FI Channel. Thirteen of the twenty directors were able to attend the festival; two traveling to Seattle from as far away as Israel and Ireland.

Short films presented
They're Made Out of Meat
Red Planet Blues
Microgravity
Cost of Living
Circus of Infinity
Heartbeat
Cost of Living
Scribble
Heyday
The Grandfather Paradox
La Vie d'un Chien (The Life of a Dog)
A Piece of Wood
Perfect Heat
Skewed
Killswitch
Wireless
Into the Maelstrom
neoplasia
Welcome to Eden
The Hard Ages-Trial Run
Super-Anon

Awards
 Grand Prize: They're Made Out of Meat (Ireland), Director: Stephen O'Regan
 Second Place: Red Planet Blues (USA), Director: David H. Brooks
 Third Place: Microgravity (USA), Director: David Sanders
 Honorable Mention: Cost of Living (Canada), Director: Jonathan Joffe
 Honorable Mention: Circus of Infinity (USA), Director: Sue Corcoran
 Honorable Mention: Heartbeat(Israel), Director: Omri Bar-Levy
 Audience Favorite: Cost of Living (Canada), Director: Jonathan Joffe
 Douglas Trumbull Award for Best Special Effects: Microgravity (USA), Director: by David Sanders

Festival Jury
Richard Hutton
Douglas Trumbull
Thomas Vitale
Craig Engler
Kathleen Murphy
Vonda McIntyre
Lawrence Krauss
Jacob McMurray
Beth Barrett

2007
On February 3, 2007, the second annual Science Fiction Short Film Festival was held at the Seattle Cinerama Theater in Seattle, Washington. The sci fi festival played to a sold-out crowd for the second year in a row. Out of a field of dozens of entries, the best short science fiction films were selected from around the United States and from as far away as England, Australia, and Taiwan. A jury of media professionals selected the best films of the 20 screened. At the festival, filmmakers answered audience questions while the crowd voted on their favorite film.

Short films presented
Transgressions
The Un-Gone
 Ways to Die at Home
Maklar, Anyone?
Atomic Banana
Singularity
The Inedible Bulk
Machinations
Fantastic Fortune
F*ck You, Pay Me
The Realm
Spaceball
Haunted Planet
Life Signs
Project K.A.T.
TV Man
Mizar
Agnieszka
The Tragical Historie of Guidolon the Giant Space Chicken
Face Machine

Awards
 Grand Prize: Transgressions (USA), Director: Valerie Weiss
 Second Place: The Un-Gone (UK), Director: Simon Bovey
 Third Place: 13 Ways to Die at Home (USA), Director: Lee Lanier
 Audience Favorite: Maklar, Anyone? (USA), Director: Phil Guzzo
 Douglas Trumbull Award for Best Special Effects: 13 Ways to Die at Home (USA), Director: Lee Lanier

2008
On February 2, 2008, the annual Science Fiction Short Film Festival was held at the Seattle Cinerama Theater in Seattle, Washington.
The Science Fiction Short Film Festival promotes and encourages an awareness, appreciation and understanding of the art of science fiction cinema. Its mandate is to create a forum for creative artistry in science fiction film and recognize the most outstanding short films produced. A pitch meeting with SCI FI Channel executives for a chance to potentially write or direct a two-hour film for the network was the grand prize.

Short films presented
Adam, Vampire
Alpha Worm
The Apparatus
E:D:E:N
Eggworld
Lucidity
Monster Job Hunter
Not 2b Toyed With
The Recordist
The Nothing Pill
Avant Petalos Grillados
EEE-Funk
Escape! From Robot Island
Forecast
Four Corners
Graw
I Was a Creature From Outer Space!
The Mourner
Operation: Fish
What Love Remains

Awards
 Grand Prize:  Forecast (USA), Director: Erik Courtney
 Second Place: Four Corners (USA), Director: Douglas Mueller
 Third Place: Escape! From Robot Island (USA), Director: Tim Thompson
 Audience Favorite: E:D:E:N (Italy), Director: Fabio Guaglione
 Douglas Trumbull Award for Best Special Effects: Operation: Fish (USA), Director: Jeff Riley

2009
On February 7, 2009, the annual Science Fiction + Fantasy Short Film Festival was held at the Seattle Cinerama Theater in Seattle, Washington.
The festival brings together industry professionals in filmmaking and the genres of science fiction and fantasy to encourage and support new, creative additions to science fiction and fantasy cinema arts.

Short films presented
BAIT
Bugbear
The Communicators
Hose
Notes from the Acrid Plain with Burton Hoary, Vol. 7
Outsource
Scion
The Whistler
Wishing Well
Wormhole Chasers
Abigail
Beatgirl – A Piece of Action!
Collector
Eel Girl
F A D E
The Heist
Hirsute
Six Impossible Things
Things Last
The Tiny Spaceship

Awards
 Grand Prize: F A D E (Australia), Director: Vincent Taylor
 Second Place: Outsource (USA), Director: Daniel Trezise
 Third Place: Notes from the Acrid Plain with Burton Hoary, Vol. 7(USA), Director: Jonathan Ashley
 Audience Favorite: Hirsute (Canada), Director: A.J. Bond
 Douglas Trumbull Award for Best Special Effects: Outsource (USA), Director: Daniel Trezise

Festival Jury
Erik Courtney
Jesse Harris
Daniel Myrick
Marc Scott Zicree
Daniel Thornton
Aristomenis Tsirbas
Chris Weitz

2010
The Science Fiction + Fantasy Short Film Festival promotes and encourages an awareness, appreciation and understanding of the art of science fiction and fantasy cinema. Its mandate is to create a forum for creative artistry in science fiction and fantasy film and recognize the most outstanding short films produced. On January 30, 2010, the annual Science Fiction Short Film Festival will be held at the Seattle Cinerama Theater in Seattle, Washington. 10 short films will screen in the first session 4:00pm – 6:00pm; 10 short films will screen in the second session 7:00pm – 9:00pm. An awards ceremony follows the second session.

Short films presented
Alma
Beast of Burden
Charlie Thistle
Die Schneider Krankheit 
Extra-Ordinary 
S.S. Humanity
Shuttle T-42
The Control Master
The Kirkie
To the Moon
Afterglow
Arthur's Lore
Burden
CC 2010
Elder Sign
Hands Off!
Hangar No. 5
Nanosporin AI
Singularity
Third Days Child

Awards
 Grand Prize: The Control Master
 Second Place: Alma
 Third Place: Charlie Thistle
 Audience Favorite: Charlie Thistle
 Douglas Trumbull Award for Best Special Effects: Hangar No. 5

Festival Jury
A.J. Bond
Jesse Harris
Susan LaSalle
Howard McCain
Daniel Myrick
Vincent Taylor
Marc Scott Zicree

2011
The Science Fiction + Fantasy Short Film Festival promotes and encourages an awareness, appreciation and understanding of the art of science fiction and fantasy cinema. Its mandate is to create a forum for creative artistry in science fiction and fantasy film and recognize the most outstanding short films produced. On January 29, 2011, the annual Science Fiction Short Film Festival will be held at the Seattle Cinerama Theater in Seattle, Washington. 10 short films will screen in the first session 4:00pm – 6:00pm; 10 short films will screen in the second session 7:30pm – 9:30pm. An awards ceremony follows the second session.

Short films presented
 All the Time in the World
 The Astronomer's Sun
 Cockpit: The Rule of Engagement
 Denmark
 Emma
 Hector Corps.
 Juan Con Miedo
 Keep Watching The Skies!
 King Eternal
 Liveline
 Local Unite
 Necronomicon
 Project Panacea
 Schizofredric
 Spark
 Super Science
 Televisnu
 TUB
 The Wonder Hospital
 Zero

Awards
 Grand Prize: The Astronomer's Sun
 Second Place: Schizofredric
 Third Place: All the Time in the World
 Audience Favorite: Hectors Corps.
 Douglas Trumbull Award for Best Special Effects: Cockpit: The Rule of Engagement

Festival Jury
 Barbara Brown
 Ben Kasulke
 Howard McCain
 Annalee Newitz
 Bragi Schut Jr.
 Lindy West
 Daniel Wilson

2012

Short films presented
 Time Freak
 Decapoda Shock
 Chorebot
 Attack of the Killer Mutant Chickens (Murgi Keno Mutant)
 Dolls Factory (Fábrica de Muñecas)
 Matter Fisher
 The Comet Chronicles
 Terminus
 Oliver Bump’s Birthday
 Dead Happy
 Mahahula the Giant Rodent of Happiness
 The Dungeon Master
 Birdboy
 The Epiphany
 The Captivus
 Crystal Jam
 Protoparticulas
 The Sierra Project
 Carta A Julia
 Madame Perrault’s Bluebeard
 The Hunger and the Swan Discuss Their Meeting

Awards
 Grand Prize: The Hunger and the Swan Discuss Their Meeting
 Second Place: Time Freak
 Third Place: Terminus
 Douglas Trumbull Award for Best Special Effects: Terminus
 Audience Choice: Time Freak

Festival Jury
 Jon Landau
 Simon Cartwright
 Jessica Cope
 Howard McCain
 Ilona Rossman Ho
 Adam Sekular
 Paul Constant
 David Goldberg

2013

Short films presented
 Lucky Day Forever
 Small Time
 Tumult
 Luminaris
 The Gate
 88:88
 Cats in Space
 Cheap Extermination
 Evelyn
 Foxes
 Frankie Rulez!!!
 Giant Monster Playset
 Oowiewanna
 A Lost and Found Box of Human Sensation
 Motorhome
 The Narrative of Victor Karloch
 Posthuman
 Thumb Snatchers from the Moon Cocoon
 You, Me + We
 The Wheel
 Zing

Awards
 Grand Prize: Lucky Day Forever
 First Runner-up : Tumult
 Second Runner-up: Luminaris
 Douglas Trumbull Award for Best Special Effects: The Gate
 Audience Award: Small Time

Festival Jury
 Sue Corcoran
 Robert Horton
 Bear McCreary
 Charles Mudede
 Andrew Allen
 Jason Sondhi
 Rider and Shiloh Strong

2014
In partnership with SIFF, EMP Museum presented the ninth annual Science Fiction + Fantasy Short Film Festival at the Seattle Cinerama on January 11, 2014.

Short films presented
 Sleepworking
 RPG OKC
 Louder, Please
 Night Giant
 Voice Over
 The Beyond
 Bless You
 The Decelerators
 Drain
 Emit
 Honeymoon Suite
 The Magic Salmon
 Mirage
 North Bay
 Robota
 Red Summer
 Shift
 Spacetime Fabric Softener
 Star-Crossed
 Willowshade

Awards
 Grand Prize: Sleepworking
 First Runner-up : Louder, Please
 Second Runner-up: Night Giant
 Douglas Trumbull Award for Best Special Effects: Voice Over
 Audience Award: RPG OKC

Festival Jury
 John Joseph Adams
 SJ Chiro
 Laura Jean Cronin
 Cheryl Henson
 David Barr Kirtley
 Marc Laidlaw
 Seth Sommerfeld

2015

The 15th Annual Science Fiction + Fantasy Short Film Fest took place at the Seattle Cinerama on Saturday, February 7, 2015. In addition to the main program on Saturday and Encore presentation on Sunday, special events were added on Friday, February 6: Escape from New York with a Live Score by Roladex, and SFFSFF The Dark Side, a presentation of horror-tinged and macabre shorts with its own awards following the screening.

Short films presented
 In the Beginning
 Tempête sur anorak (Storm Hits Jacket)
 Time Travel Lover
 Destiny
 Wanderers
 The Looking Planet
 Lessons Learned
 The Nostalgist
 Making Friends
 Little Quentin
 Pandy (Pandas)
 The Master’s Voice: caveirão
 Sorry About Tomorrow
 A Stitch in Time (for $9.99)
 LUCID
 Wakening
 Day 40
 Caldera
 Gumdrop

Awards
 Grand Prize: Caldera
 First Runner-up : In the Beginning
 Second Runner-up: Little Quentin
 Douglas Trumbull Award for Best Special Effects: Gumdrop
 Audience Award: In the Beginning

The Dark Side Short films presented Malaria
 Hungry Hickory
 Carn
 Luna
 Pupa
 Grave Shivers
 Kekasih
 Cold Turkey
 Dji. Death FailsAwards Grand Prize: Carn
 First Runner-up : Kekasih
 Audience Award: MalariaFestival Jury Gregg Hale
 Andrew Bowler
 Chris Harrison
 Meg Humphrey
 Ben Kasulke
 Mark Shapiro
 Tom Tangney
 Gavin Williams

2016

The 16th Annual Science Fiction + Fantasy Short Film Fest took place at the Seattle Cinerama on Saturday, March 19, 2016, with an Encore presentation on Sunday.Short films presented Aden
 Frost
 The Witching Hour
 The Red Thunder
 The Future Perfect
 Goblin Queen
 Palm Rot
 Tristes Déserts (A Robot's Tale)
 The Garden
 La Fille Bionique (Bionic Girl)
 Mis-Drop
 Employee of the Day
 Juliet
 Way Out
 The Brain Hack
 No Look Dunk
 Disco Inferno (dir. Alice Waddington)
 They Will All Die in Space
 DoublesAwards'
 Grand Prize Winner: Aden
 Second Place Winner: Frost
 Third Place Winner: Juliet
 Douglas Trumbull Award for Visual Effects: Aden

References 

2014

2013
 

2012

2011

2010

2009

2008

2007

2006

Articles
"Science Fiction + Fantasy Short Film Festival 2011" (Seattle PI People's Critic)
"EMP Museum photos of SFFSFF(2011)" (Flickr)
"2010 Recap(2010)" (Sci-Filink)
"A Walk Through SFFSFF (2010)" (A Random Walk Through Film)
"Norwescon Photos of SFFSFF(2010)" (Flickr)
"Official Photos of SFFSFF(2010)" (EMPSFM)
"BURDEN Fan Feedback at SFFSFF (2010)" (Twitvid)
"Recap of SFFSFF (2010)" (NWSFS)
"Seattle's SFFSFF (2010)" (Seattle PI People's Critic)
"SFFSFF Recap (2010)" (Tangerine Penguin)
"Science Fiction, Double Feature(2010)" (City Noises)
"Let's All Go To The Movies(2010)" (Seattlest)
"SIFF & EMPSFM Present SFFSFF(2010)" (Queen Anne View)
"Movies This Weekend(2010)" (Seattle Times)
"Treasure seekers find more than expected in HANGAR NO. 5(2010)" (Quiet Earth)
"Humanity high-tails it to space in scifi short S.S. HUMANITY (2010)" (Quiet Earth)
"5th Annual SFFSFF (2010)" (Seattle Film-Music Newsletter)
"Sci Fi & Fantasy Film Fest(2010)" (MetroBlogging)
"Science Fiction and Fantasy Short Film Festival invades Seattle this Saturday(2010)" (Culture Mob)
"Interview of Brooks Peck on SFFSFF(2010)" (Seattle Geekly)
"Save The Date: SFFSFF(2010)" (NW Production Blog)
"Hey Seattle! Fifth Annual Science Fiction + Fantasy Short Film Festival!(2010)" (Twitch Films)
"Astounding Tales of Science Fiction(2009)" (Daily UW)
"2009 Recap(2009)" (Sci-Filink)
"Official Photos of SFFSFF(2009)" (EMPSFM)
"The Tiny Spaceship Lands in Seattle Saturday(2009)" (Seattlest)
"Seattle Sci-Fi Fans Get Their Fix(2009)" (On Screen Mag)
"Please Turn Off Your Vibrators & Pacemakers(2008)" (Fuzzy World)
"2nd Annual Seattle SFSFF(2007)" (Mark Atwood)
Second Annual SFFSFF Seattle"(2007)"(Mad Times)
"Science Fiction Short Film Festival(2007)" (Wild Realm Reviews)
"1st Annual Science Fiction Short Festival Launched(2006)" (Solar Flare)
"Sci-fi in Seattle(2006)" (Greencine)
"SF Short Film Festival(2006)" (Mad Times)

External links
 Science Fiction + Fantasy Short Film Festival(SFFSFF)
 EMP Museum official website
 SIFF home page

Fantasy and horror film festivals in the United States
Festivals in Seattle
Seattle Area conventions
Culture of Seattle
Tourist attractions in Washington (state)
Film festivals in Washington (state)
Film festivals established in 2006
Science fiction film festivals